Hai'an is a county-level city under the administration of the prefecture-level city of Nantong, in eastern Jiangsu province, China. Bordering Dongtai to the north, Rudong to the south-east, Rugao to the south, Taixing to the south-west, and Jiangyan to the west, the city is located on the south-western shores of the Yellow Sea.

Hai'an city includes 14 towns. They are Hǎi'ān, Lǎobàgǎng, Jiǎoxié, Lǐbǎo, Xīchǎng, Dàgōng, Chéngdōng, Sūnzhuāng, Yǎzhōu, Qūtáng, Hújí, Nánmò, Báidiàn and Dūntóu.

History 
In 411, Haining (not the one in Zhejiang), a county administered the area of Hai'an nowadays and its environs was founded. In 471, western Haining was separated to create Hai'an county. The county was dissolved soon, but it was created again in 708. Some fourteen years later, it was reduced to town status and annexed by Hailing county, then Taizhou. During the second Sino-Japanese war, Zishi county was founded by the communist government there in 1943, it was renamed Hai'an in 1948. It was transferred to Nantong in 1950.

Administrative divisions
In the present, Hai'an County has 10 towns. 
10 towns

Climate

References

External links

 
Nantong
County-level divisions of Jiangsu